Mafalda Veiga (born 24 December 1965) is a Portuguese singer-songwriter, born in Lisbon.

Discography

 Pássaros do sul (1987)
 Planície (single, 1987)
 Cantar (1988)
 Nada se repete (1992)
 A cor da fogueira (1996)
 Tatuagem (1999)
 Cada lugar teu (single, 1999)
 Um pouco mais (1999), wrote to Susana Félix
 Mafalda Veiga ao Vivo (live, 2000)
 Na alma e na pele (2003)
 Lado a Lado (2006), duet with João Pedro Pais
 Chão (2008)
 Zoom (2011)
 Grandes êxitos (2013)
 "essencial" (2014)
 Praia (2016)

Bibliography

 Songbook de Mafalda Veiga (Quasi Edições, 2004)

External links
  Official site
  Lyrics from Mafalda Veiga

1965 births
Living people
Portuguese women singer-songwriters
Portuguese songwriters
Singers from Lisbon
Portuguese singer-songwriters